7-Deoxyloganetic acid is an iridoid monoterpene.  It is produced from nepetalactol or iridodial by the enzyme iridoid oxidase (IO).  7-Deoxyloganetic acid is a substrate for 7-deoxyloganetic acid glucosyltransferase (7-DLGT) which synthesizes 7-deoxyloganic acid.

References

Iridoids
Carboxylic acids
Cyclopentanes